Wister Public Schools is the school district of Wister, Oklahoma. It contains an elementary school and a combined middle/high school.

References

External links
 Wister Public Schools - Alt URL
 

School districts in Oklahoma
Education in Le Flore County, Oklahoma